Ramgaon is a village in Kamrup rural district, situated in north bank of river Brahmaputra, surrounded by Goreswar and Baihata

Transport
The village is located north of National Highway 31, connected to nearby towns and cities with regular buses and other modes of transportation.

See also
 Titkuri
 Tinali
 Tengajhar

References

Villages in Kamrup district